Oliver James Beckingsale (born 7 June 1976 in Backwell, Bristol), is an ex-professional mountain biker. He represented Britain at the Olympic Games in 2000, 2004 and 2008, and England at the Commonwealth Games in 2002 and 2006. He retired from professional cycling in 2013.

Major results

2001
 1st  National XC Championships
2002
 1st  National XC Championships
2005
 1st  National XC Championships
 6th UEC European XC Championships
 9th UCI World XC Championships
2006
 1st  National XC Championships
 1st British National Points Series
 2nd  Cross-country, Commonwealth Games

References
Biography, British Cycling

External links
Interview with British Cycling 18 April 2008

1976 births
English male cyclists
Living people
Olympic cyclists of Great Britain
Commonwealth Games silver medallists for England
Cyclists at the 2000 Summer Olympics
Cyclists at the 2002 Commonwealth Games
Cyclists at the 2004 Summer Olympics
Cyclists at the 2006 Commonwealth Games
Cyclists at the 2008 Summer Olympics
Cross-country mountain bikers
People from Backwell
Commonwealth Games medallists in cycling
Medallists at the 2006 Commonwealth Games